Meat puppet (or puppets) may refer to: 
 Meatpuppet, a new user invited to an internet discussion solely to influence it, similar to a sockpuppet
 Meat Puppets, an American rock band
 Meat Puppets (album), the band's eponymous debut album, released in 1982
 Meat Puppet (video game), a 1997 video game developed by Kronos Digital Entertainment